Rischel is a surname. Notable people with the surname include:

 Anna-Grethe Rischel (born 1935), Danish paper conservator and paper historian
 Jørgen Rischel (1934–2007), Danish linguist

See also
 Ruschel